The Taichung Municipal Wen-Hua Senior High School is one of the most prestigious senior high schools of Taiwan located in Taichung. It was founded on July 1, 1989. WHSH has been accredited by the Ministry of Education as a First Tier High School.

Introduction

Location
The school is located close to the National Museum of Natural Science, Taichung City Hall, and Taichung Shuinan Economic and Trade Park. Wenhua Senior High School Station（文華高中站）is next to the school.

Reputation
Most of graduate students choose to go further in higher education. With above average scores in College Entrance Examination, students graduated from WHSH usually have a high admission rate to the first-tier universities. Some of the students also choose to study in the United States and Europe.

Wen-Hua Senior High School is one of the remarkable high schools national wide. It is also a well-known member of the Four Provincial Schools  （四省中）in Taichung area. From 2015, WHSH and other four famous high schools in Taichung have established the Taichung Big 5 affiliation.

The school provides excellent STEM courses, humanities courses, and Dancing courses in national standard. The Club of Chinese Music, Ya Feng Guoyue（雅風國樂社）is one of the top high school musical performance groups in Taiwan.

History
WHSH is one of the youngest schools in Taiwan and it is also the only school of the "Four Schools" established after the World War II period.

WHSH has established in 1989 to fulfill the strong need of intermediate education because of the explosive population growth in great Taichung area. It was named Taiwan Provincial Taichung Wen-Hua Senior High School as it was first founded.
In 2000, due to the "Government Reformation," the school was managed by the central government under Ministry of Education, and renamed National Wen-Hua Senior High School.

Partner Schools

Pacific Ridge School

Saskatoon Public School Division

Osaka Prefectural Minoo High School
Osaka Prefectural Tennoji High School

Sejong Global High School
Seoul Global High School

See also

 Education in Taiwan

References

External links

 Taichung Municipal Wen-Hua Senior High School
 WHSH YouTube Channel

1989 establishments in Taiwan
Educational institutions established in 1989
High schools in Taiwan
Schools in Taichung